Gymnocolea is a genus of liverworts belonging to the family Anastrophyllaceae.

The genus has cosmopolitan distribution.

Species:
 Gymnocolea acutiloba K.Müller
 Gymnocolea borealis (Frisvoll & Moen) R.M.Schust.

References

Jungermanniales
Jungermanniales genera